Johnson Sunday (born 10 January 1981) is a Nigerian former international footballer who played as a midfielder.

Career
Sunday played for Kwara United.

He participated at the 2000 Summer Olympics, and earned one senior cap for Nigeria in 1999.

References

1981 births
Living people
Nigerian footballers
Nigeria international footballers
Olympic footballers of Nigeria
Kwara United F.C. players
Association football midfielders